Yanpi is a type of wonton skin used in Chinese cuisine. Lean pork meat taken from the shanks is mixed with glutinous rice, pounded to a paste, then sprinkled with starch. The meat gives yanpi a taste and texture similar to that of surimi. The thin yanpi skins are used to wrap bianrouyan (Hokchew Romanized: Biēng-nṳ̆k-iéng), a type of meat wonton which are often used in taiping yan, a soup eaten on special occasions in Fujian. Yanpi is a speciality of Northern Fujianese cuisine, particularly Putian cuisine.
Wang Shitong popularized yanpi in the first decades of the 20th century by drying it, allowing it to be stored for long periods rather than used on the day it was made.

References

Fujian cuisine
Chinese cuisine
Pork dishes